Rattlesnake Hill is a summit in the U.S. state of Nevada.

Rattlesnake Hill was so named on account of rattlesnakes on and around the summit.

References

Mountains of Churchill County, Nevada